Il Verri is a quarterly literary magazine, which has been published since 1956. The magazine is based in Milan, Italy.

History and profile
Il Verri was started by Luciano Anceschi in Milan in 1956. The magazines is published quarterly in Milan. However, in 1973 it temporarily moved to Bologna.

In the early 1960s Il Verri began to cover the writings of neo avant garde authors, including Umberto Eco, Edoardo Sanguineti, Antonio Porta and Nanni Balestrini. They were part of a literary circle called Gruppo 63. The magazine played a significant role for Umberto Eco in shaping his theories. Luciano Erba and Alfredo Giuliani were also among the contributors.

From its start in 1956 Il Verri has been instrumental in making some approaches familiar in Italy such as phenomenology, structuralism and semiology. The magazine also covers poems were collected by Luciano Anceschi in a book in 1961.

See also
List of avant-garde magazines
List of magazines in Italy

References

External links
 Official website

1956 establishments in Italy
Avant-garde magazines
Italian-language magazines
Literary magazines published in Italy
Magazines established in 1956
Magazines published in Milan
Mass media in Bologna
Poetry literary magazines
Quarterly magazines published in Italy